Romulo Tolentino de la Cruz, D.D., (June 24, 1947 – December 10, 2021) was a prelate of the Roman Catholic Church in the Philippines. He was the Roman Catholic Archbishop of Zamboanga in the Philippines.

Life and Ministry
Romulo T. de la Cruz was born on June 24, 1947, in Balasan, Iloilo where he was ordained priest of Cotabato, Philippines on December 8, 1972. He was ordained Coadjutor Bishop for the Roman Catholic Territorial Prelature of Isabela in 1988 to succeed Bishop Jose Maria Mendizabal in 1989. In 2002, he was also appointed Coadjutor Bishop of the Roman Catholic Diocese of San Jose de Antique, and also succeeded as Bishop in 2002. He became the bishop of Roman Catholic Diocese of Kidapawan on May 14, 2008.

On March 15, 2014, Pope Francis appointed de la Cruz as Roman Catholic Archbishop of Zamboanga, which was vacant since Archbishop Romulo Valles was appointed Roman Catholic Archbishop of Davao.

De la Cruz died on December 10, 2021, at the age of 74.

References

External links
Archbishop Romulo Tolentino de la Cruz 
Archdiocese of Zamboanga 

1947 births
2021 deaths
People from Iloilo
People from Cotabato
21st-century Roman Catholic archbishops in the Philippines
Roman Catholic archbishops of Zamboanga